Eddie Martinez may refer to:
 Eddie Martinez (musician)
 Eddie Martinez (artist)